

Central bank

Central Bank of Malta

Commercial banks

Akbank T.A.S. 
APS Bank Limited  
Banif Bank (Malta) plc 
Bank of Valletta plc 
BAWAG Malta Bank Limited 
CommBank Europe Limited 
Credorax Bank (Malta) Limited 
Deutsche Bank (Malta) Limited 
Erste Bank (Malta) Limited 
FCM Bank Limited 
FIMBank
Fortis Bank Malta Limited 
HSBC Bank Malta plc 
IIG Bank (Malta) Limited 
ICBC Bank Malta Limited 
Investkredit International Bank plc 
Izola Bank plc 
Lombard Bank Malta plc 
MeDirect Bank Malta  (formerly Mediterranean Bank)
NBG Bank Malta Limited 
Novum Bank Limited 
Pilatus Bank Ltd. 
Raiffeisen Malta plc 
Satabank 
Sparkasse Bank Malta plc 
Turkiye Garanti Bankasi A S 
Nordea Bank AB Malta [24]
Go Bank Malta Limited

Banks in liquidation
Nemea Bank plc 

Complete list as of May 30, 2013, based on official lists available at Malta Financial Services Authority .

Banks
Malta
Malta